Sullivan & Cromwell LLP is an American multinational law firm headquartered in New York City. Known as a white-shoe firm, Sullivan & Cromwell is recognized as a leader in business law, and is known for its impact on international affairs, such as the financing of the Panama Canal. The firm handles high profile work such as complex mergers and acquisitions, securities litigation, and white-collar defense and government investigations. It is one of the most profitable law firms in the world, with 2021 profits per partner exceeding $6 million and profits per lawyer exceeding $1.3 million.

History
Founded in 1879 by Algernon Sydney Sullivan and William Nelson Cromwell, Sullivan & Cromwell advised John Pierpont Morgan during the creation of Edison General Electric (1882) and later guided key players in the formation of U.S. Steel (1901). Cromwell developed the concept of a holding company, persuading New Jersey to include it in state law and enabling companies incorporating there to avoid antitrust laws. The firm also worked with less-successful businesses during the volatile decades before the establishment of modern federal bankruptcy laws; it pioneered efforts to reorganize insolvent companies through what became known as the "Cromwell plan." Cromwell was called "the physician of Wall Street" for his ability to rescue failing companies.

The post-World War I era saw an expanded need for financing. Sullivan & Cromwell designed many of the equity and debt agreements used during this period, including 94 loan agreements to European borrowers during one seven-year period. The firm's business expanded substantially during the 1930s, when it began to represent companies facing increased regulation and became for a time the world's biggest law firm. During the Great Depression and its aftermath, the firm litigated in the newly emerging fields of shareholder derivatives, antitrust actions, federal income tax law, and registration under the Securities Act of 1933. The firm developed the first major registration statement under the Securities Act of 1933 and influenced the development of tax law in the mutual fund industry.
 
Sullivan & Cromwell performed the legal work for the Ford Motor Company's $643 million offering in 1956, the biggest ever to that date. Evolving business trends continued to be reflected in the firm's organization; a banking practice was formed in 1968, and a mergers and acquisitions unit was established in 1980, as M&A began to accelerate. By the middle of that decade, the M&A unit generated a third of the firm's revenue.

International practice
The firm's international practice dates back to its early years and the development of America's industrial and transportation infrastructure. Sullivan & Cromwell represented European bankers financing the construction of railroads and other elements of the nation's infrastructure. By the turn of the century, Cromwell represented French interests that owned land in Panama and was involved in the financing of the Panama Canal; the firm represents the Panama Canal Authority to this day.

Sullivan & Cromwell was one of the earliest U.S. firms to open overseas offices, beginning with Paris in 1911. By 1928, offices also were open in Buenos Aires and Berlin. In 1935, Allen Dulles, then a partner in the firm and later Director of Central Intelligence, visited Germany and returned somewhat disturbed by the direction of the regime. Over the sole opposition of Allen's brother and fellow partner, John Foster Dulles, the firm's partners voted in 1935 to close the Berlin office and a subsidiary in Frankfurt. However, later the firm backdated the announcement of the closing of their German offices by one year, to 1934. Under Foster Dulles, the firm had helped the regime's arms buildup effort by including the German company I.G. Farben into an international nickel cartel, which included American, Canadian, and French producers.

Two former chairmen of the firm held senior foreign policy positions during the Eisenhower administration: John Foster Dulles, who served as U.S. Secretary of State; and Arthur Dean, who represented the United States in negotiations resulting in the Korean Armistice Agreement.

Notable clients and cases
 Ongoing representation of bankrupt cryptocurrency exchange, FTX.
 Advised Kraft Foods in 2015 during its $55 billion merger with Heinz, making the combined Kraft Heinz North America's third-largest food and beverage company.
 Represented BP in its global $18.7 billion settlement in the 2010 Deepwater Horizon oil spill. The firm continues to represent BP in related securities and class action suits. 
 Advised AT&T in its acquisition of DirecTV in a $67 billion transaction in 2014.
 Advised a special directors' committee of Dole Food Company during the effort by major shareholder David Murdock to take the company private in 2013, together with related follow-up litigation.
 Beginning in 2011, advised Kodak during its Chapter 11 bankruptcy restructuring and subsequent reemergence as a public company. The transaction was named Technology, Media, Telecom Deal of the Year (over $1 billion) by M&A ADVISOR and Turnaround of the Year: Mega Company, by the Turnaround Management Association. 
 Served as national coordinating counsel for German automaker Volkswagen Group in connection with the settlement of multidistrict litigation arising from the company's emissions violations. The settlement built upon Sullivan & Cromwell's earlier representation of Porsche SE (a majority shareholder in Volkswagen), which set precedents on cross-border securities litigation.
 Represented Ferrari and its principal shareholder in an initial public offering, part of nearly $370 billion worth of equity and debt offerings in which Sullivan & Cromwell represented issuing companies during 2015.
 Represented Los Angeles Dodgers co-owner Frank McCourt in the $2.15 billion Chapter 11 bankruptcy sale of the team to Guggenheim Baseball Management.
 Represented Barclays in investigations regarding manipulation of Libor and the foreign exchange market.
 Represented a number of leading commercial and investment banks, asset managers and other companies in transactions during and after the financial crisis of 2008, including Bear Stearns, Lehman Brothers, Fannie Mae, American International Group (AIG), Wachovia, National City and Barclays.
 Represented Cory Maples on a pro bono basis in the appeal of his murder conviction. The firm missed a deadline in Maples' death row appeal after the two attorneys handling the case left the firm without notifying the court in Alabama. A ruling on a denial petition was sent to Sullivan & Cromwell. However, the mailroom returned the envelopes to the court. In the 2012 Supreme Court case Maples v. Thomas, Justice Ruth Bader Ginsburg wrote: "Abandoned by counsel, Maples was left unrepresented at a critical time for his state post-conviction petition, and he lacked a clue of any need to protect himself pro se. In these circumstances, no just system would lay the default at Maples' death-cell door."

Controversies

1954 Guatemala coup d'état
Sullivan & Cromwell's involvement in the 1954 coup d'état in Guatemala is documented. At the time, the firm represented the United Fruit Company (UFC), which had major holdings in Guatemala. UFC used its lobbying power, through the firm and through other means, to convince President Eisenhower, as well as Secretary of State John Foster Dulles, and his brother, CIA director Allen Dulles, both alumni of the firm, to depose the democratically elected President of Guatemala, Jacobo Arbenz.

Insider trading
In 2008, police uncovered an insider trading conspiracy involving a former Sullivan & Cromwell attorney; Toronto Dorsey & Whitney partner Gil Cornblum had discovered inside information at both Sullivan & Cromwell and Dorsey and, with his co-conspirator, a former lawyer and Cornblum's law school classmate, was found to have gained over $10 million in illegal profits over a 14-year span. Cornblum committed suicide by jumping from a bridge as he was under investigation and shortly before he was to be arrested but before criminal charges were laid against him, one day before his alleged co-conspirator pleaded guilty.

Tobacco companies 
Sullivan & Cromwell has worked on behalf of tobacco companies. In 2008, the law firm advised on a merger on the tobacco companies Altria and UST.

Rankings and awards
 Received 39 total practice rankings in the 2016 edition of Chambers USA: America's Leading Lawyers for Business, including 28 in the top two bands; also received 105 total lawyer recommendations in the directory, with a total of 70 partners ranking 
 Listed as a top law firm in 11 categories in the 2016 edition of Chambers Europe, including five in the top two bands, with 18 total recommendations in the directory 
 Listed as a top law firm in nine categories in the 2016 edition of Chambers Asia-Pacific, including four rankings in the top two bands; firm attorneys received 11 total recommendations in the directory
 Ranked highly in several key categories on Thomson's First Quarter 2016 Global Capital Markets Legal Counsel League Tables, including #1 in the United States in 14 separate categories of equity or debt issuance
 Ranked highly in several key categories on Bloomberg's First Quarter 2016 Global Capital Markets Legal Counsel League Tables, including in the top two in 12 separate bond issuance classes
 Honored by Best Lawyers in America for having 90 attorneys listed on the publication's 2017 list, with four Sullivan & Cromwell attorneys being named "Lawyer of the Year"
 Ranked highly in two important categories on Thomson's 2015 Global Syndicated Loans Legal Counsel League Tables
 Ranked first or second in nine categories in Bloomberg's 2015 Capital Markets Legal Counsel League Tables
 Ranked among the top 10 in three categories on Bloomberg's 2015 Loans Legal Counsel League Tables, including #2 as legal adviser to borrowers in U.S. Loans
 Ranked highly in several key categories on Thomson's 2015 Global Capital Markets Legal Counsel League Tables, including ranking in the top three in 14 categories of capital markets issuance
 Recognized by The American Lawyer's Global Legal Awards for its work in M&A, including being named as one of the firms awarded Global M&A Deal of the Year: Grand Prize winner, for its role in AB InBev's acquisition of SABMiller
 Named one of America's Best Corporate Law Firms in the 16th annual "Law in the Boardroom" study conducted by NYSE Governance Services and FTI Consulting, Inc.; ranked third on the 2016 National Law Firm Directors' Rankings, up from fourth place in 2015
 Named a Diversity Leader by Profiles in Diversity Journal in its Winter 2016 issue, reflecting the firm's having aligned diversity initiatives with business goals
 Cited for the 10th consecutive year by The Dave Thomas Foundation for Adoption as one of the nation's "Best Adoption-Friendly Workplaces"
Sullivan & Cromwell has been recognized for its pro bono activities, receiving a "Pro Bono Leadership Award" from Legal Services NYC in 2016 and ranked by Law360 as being among the Top 20 Pro Bono Law Firms in 2015.

Notable employees
 Alexandra D. Korry, partner and chair of the New York City Bar Association’s Committee
M. Bernard Aidinoff, partner and chairman of Section of Taxation of the American Bar Association
Ann Althouse, blogger and professor of law
Louis Auchincloss, lawyer, novelist, historian, and essayist
Michael Bryant, lawyer and politician
Dhananjaya Y. Chandrachud, Chief Justice of the Supreme Court of India
Jay Clayton, Chair of the U.S. Securities and Exchange Commission (2017-2020) during the Donald Trump administration
Amal Clooney, human rights lawyer, activist, George Clooney's wife
H. Rodgin Cohen, corporate lawyer
Norris Darrell, president, American Law Institute
Florence A. Davis, president of the Starr Foundation
Arthur Dean, lawyer and diplomat
Vicente Blanco Gaspar , lawyer and ambassador 
Allen Welsh Dulles, Director of Central Intelligence (1953-1961)
John Foster Dulles, U.S. Secretary of State (1953-1959)
Ronald Dworkin, philosopher and law professor
Judith Kaye, chief judge of the New York Court of Appeals
Robert MacCrate, counsel to New York Governor Nelson D. Rockefeller, special counsel to the Department of the Army for its investigation of the My Lai Massacre
Paul Mahoney, former dean, University of Virginia Law School
Robert McC. Marsh, member of the New York State Assembly, Justice of the New York Supreme Court
Bruce Menin, businessman
Steven Peikin, co-director of the SEC Enforcement Division (2017-2020)
Keith Rabois, technology entrepreneur and investor
Frederic C. Rich, author, lawyer, and environmentalist
Samuel W. Seymour, former president of the NYC Bar Association
Hans Smit, Columbia Law School professor and mentor of Ruth Bader Ginsburg
Roy Steyer, Nuremberg Trial proscuter
Harlan Fiske Stone, Chief Justice of the United States
Peter Thiel, technology entrepreneur, venture capitalist and co-founder of PayPal
Joseph Tsai, vice chairman of Alibaba Group
Elizabeth Carroll Wingo, judge on the Superior Court of the District of Columbia 
Mark Wiseman, Head of Global Active Equity and Chairman of the Global Investment Committee, BlackRock; former president & chief executive officer, Canada Pension Plan Investment Board
Lori Fisler Damrosch, law professor
Benjamin L. Liebman, law professor
John O. McGinnis, George C. Dix Professor in Constitutional Law, Northwestern Pritzker School of Law

See also 
List of largest law firms by profits per partner
White shoe firms
 Tip and Trade
 Insider trading

References

Further reading

Oller, John (2019) White Shoe: How a New Breed of Wall Street Lawyers Changed Big Business--and the American Century

External links
Sullivan & Cromwell's website
National Law Review profile

 
Law firms established in 1879
Law firms based in New York City
Foreign law firms with offices in Hong Kong
Foreign law firms with offices in Japan